"Tears of Sorrow" is the first single by The Primettes, later known as The Supremes, released in 1960. This was their first and only single from Lu Pine Records. "Tears of Sorrow," along with the Mary Wilson-led "Pretty Baby", are the only known recordings that feature the vocals of Betty McGlown. It would later appear on the 2000 box set The Supremes. The Supremes would later rerecord the song at Motown, but this version would go unreleased until the 2008 compilation album Let The Music Play: Supreme Rarities 1960-1969.

Credits

Tears Of Sorrow

Lu Pine version
Lead vocals by Diana Ross
Background vocals by Florence Ballard, Mary Wilson and Betty McGlown
Instrumentation by Ron and the Red Vests

Motown version
Lead vocals by Diana Ross
Background vocals by Florence Ballard, Mary Wilson and Barbara Martin
Instrumentation by The Funk Brothers

Pretty Baby
Lead vocals by Mary Wilson 
Solo vocals on intro by Florence Ballard
Background vocals by Florence Ballard, Betty McGlown, Diana Ross

References

External links

1960 debut singles
1960 songs
The Supremes songs
Songs written by Richard Morris (songwriter)